James Francis Gusella (born 1952 in Ottawa) is a Canadian molecular biologist and geneticist, also known as "Lucky Jim". He is professor of neurogenetics and director of the Center for Neurofibromatosis and Allied Disorders at Harvard Medical School, and director of the Center for Human Genetic Research at Massachusetts General Hospital.

Awards
In 1997 he was awarded the King Faisal International Prize in Medicine together with Konrad Beyreuther and Colin L. Masters for contributions to the understanding of neurodegenerative diseases. He has also received the Metlife Foundation Award for Medical Research in Alzheimer's Disease (1987), the Taylor Prize (1994), the Charles A. Dana Award for Pioneering Achievement in Health and Education (1998), the Neuronal Plasticity Prize (2004), and the William Allan Award of the American Society of Human Genetics (2016).

References

1952 births
20th-century Canadian biologists
Alzheimer's disease researchers
Biography articles needing translation from German Wikipedia
Canadian molecular biologists
Canadian geneticists
Living people